Drama High: The Incredible True Story of a Brilliant Teacher, a Struggling Town, and the Magic of Theater, or simply Drama High, is a 2013 nonfiction book by The New York Times Magazine writer Michael Sokolove that follows a year in the life of the drama program of Harry S. Truman High School in Levittown, Bucks County, Pennsylvania.

Overview
Journalist Sokolove tells the story of a year spent at his old school, Harry S Truman High School, chronicling the school's drama program led by master teacher Lou Volpe. In his 40 years of teaching there, Volpe revolutionized the theater program in Levittown, Pennsylvania, a blue-collar town that has been on a slow economic downswing since the 1960s. Truman has become known for its drama program thanks to Volpe, whose productions draw not only critical acclaim but also the attention of famous theater producers, who have used the program to try out school-appropriate adaptations of controversial Broadway shows.

Television adaptation

In January 2017, NBC ordered a pilot from Jason Katims based on Sokolove's book. Katims wrote the script, and also served as an executive producer alongside Jeffrey Seller, Michelle Lee and Flody Suarez. The pilot was ordered to series with the title Rise on May 5, 2017.

References

2013 non-fiction books
Riverhead Books books
American non-fiction books
Works about performing arts education